A spugna is an instrument of penance used by some Christians who practice mortification of the flesh. With the word "spugna" literally meaning "sponge", spugnas are made from circular shaped cork that contains metal studs, metal spikes, or needles. Christians, especially those who are enrolled in a confraternity of penitents, strike the spugna against their chests to repent of sins and to share in the Passion of Christ. Spugna are used in the privacy of one's dwelling, as well as in public Christian processions. When in public, beaters (battenti) cover their faces with capirote in order to not draw attention to themselves as they repent, but to God; these include men, women and children. As those using the spugna sometimes bleed, white wine is poured on top of the spugna to cleanse it and protect the wound from infection.

See also 

Instruments of penance
Confraternities of the Cord
Purity ring

References 

Christian practices
Christian terminology